Vladimir Fedoseyevich Rayevsky (– ) was a Russian poet, who participated in the Patriotic war of 1812.

After the war, when living in Tiraspol, he became a leading member of the Southern Society of Decembrists. The world's only known statue of him is located in Tiraspol.

References

1795 births
1872 deaths
Russian male poets
19th-century poets
19th-century male writers from the Russian Empire
Prisoners of the Peter and Paul Fortress